Epimorius suffusus is a species of snout moth in the genus Epimorius. It was described by Philipp Christoph Zeller in 1877 and is known from Brazil and Costa Rica.

References

Moths described in 1877
Tirathabini
Moths of Central America
Moths of South America